Histone acetyltransferase p300 also known as p300 HAT or E1A-associated protein p300 (where E1A = adenovirus early region 1A) also known as EP300 or p300 is an enzyme that, in humans, is encoded by the EP300 gene. It functions as histone acetyltransferase that regulates transcription of genes via chromatin remodeling by allowing histone proteins to wrap DNA less tightly. This enzyme  plays an essential role in regulating cell growth and division, prompting cells to mature and assume specialized functions (differentiate), and preventing the growth of cancerous tumors. The p300 protein appears to be critical for normal development before and after birth.

The EP300 gene is located on the long (q) arm of the human chromosome 22 at position 13.2. This gene encodes the adenovirus E1A-associated cellular p300 transcriptional co-activator protein.

EP300 is closely related to another gene, CREB binding protein, which is found on human chromosome 16.

Function 

p300 HAT functions as histone acetyltransferase that regulates transcription via chromatin remodeling, and is important in the processes of cell proliferation and differentiation. It mediates cAMP-gene regulation by binding specifically to phosphorylated CREB protein.

p300 HAT contains a bromodomain which is involved in IL6 signaling.

This gene has also been identified as a co-activator of HIF1A (hypoxia-inducible factor 1 alpha), and, thus, plays a role in the stimulation of hypoxia-induced genes such as VEGF.

Mechanism 

The p300 protein carries out its function of activating transcription by binding to transcription factors, and the transcription machinery. On the basis of this function, p300 is called a transcriptional coactivator. The p300 interaction with transcription factors is managed by one or more of p300 domains: the nuclear receptor interaction domain (RID), the KIX domain (CREB and MYB interaction domain), the cysteine/histidine regions (TAZ1/CH1 and TAZ2/CH3) and the interferon response binding domain (IBiD). The last four domains, KIX, TAZ1, TAZ2 and IBiD of p300, each bind tightly to a sequence spanning both transactivation domains 9aaTADs of transcription factor p53.

Clinical significance 

Mutations in the EP300 gene are responsible for a small percentage of cases of Rubinstein-Taybi syndrome. These mutations result in the loss of one copy of the gene in each cell, which reduces the amount of p300 protein by half. Some mutations lead to the production of a very short, nonfunctional version of the p300 protein, while others prevent one copy of the gene from making any protein at all. Although researchers do not know how a reduction in the amount of p300 protein leads to the specific features of Rubinstein-Taybi syndrome, it is clear that the loss of one copy of the EP300 gene disrupts normal development.

Chromosomal rearrangements involving chromosome 22 have rarely been associated with certain types of cancer. These rearrangements, called translocations, disrupt the region of chromosome 22 that contains the EP300 gene. For example, researchers have found a translocation between chromosomes 8 and 22 in several people with a cancer of blood cells called acute myeloid leukemia (AML). Another translocation, involving chromosomes 11 and 22, has been found in a small number of people who have undergone cancer treatment. This chromosomal change is associated with the development of AML following chemotherapy for other forms of cancer.

Mutations in the EP300 gene have been identified in several other types of cancer. These mutations are somatic, which means they are acquired during a person's lifetime and are present only in certain cells. Somatic mutations in the EP300 gene have been found in a small number of solid tumors, including cancers of the colon and rectum, stomach, breast, and pancreas. Studies suggest that EP300 mutations may also play a role in the development of some prostate cancers, and could help predict whether these tumors will increase in size or spread to other parts of the body. In cancer cells, EP300 mutations prevent the gene from producing any functional protein. Without p300, cells cannot effectively restrain growth and division, which can allow cancerous tumors to form.

Interactions 

EP300 has been shown to interact with:

 BCL3, 
 BRCA1, 
 CDX2, 
 CEBPB, 
 CITED1, 
 CITED2, 
 DDX5, 
 DTX1, 
 EID1, 
 ELK1, 
 ESR1, 
 FEN1, 
 GPS2, 
 HIF1A, 
 HNF1A, 
 HNRPU, 
 ING4, 
 ING5, 
 IRF2, 
 LEF1, 
 MAF, 
 MAML1, 
 MEF2C, 
 MEF2D, 
 MYBL2, 
 Mdm2, 
 MyoD, 
 MEF2A, 
 NCOA6, 
 NFATC2, 
 NPAS2, 
 P53, 
 PAX6, 
 PCNA, 
 PROX1, 
 PTMA, 
 PPARA, 
 PPARG, 
 RORA, 
 RELA, 
 SMAD1, 
 SMAD2, 
 SMAD7, 
 SNIP1, 
 SS18, 
 STAT3, 
 STAT6, 
 TAL1,
 TCF3, 
 TFAP2A, 
 TGS1, 
 TRERF1, 
 TSG101, 
 THRA, 
 TWIST1, 
 YY1,  and
 Zif268.

References

Further reading

External links 
  GeneReviews/NCBI/NIH/UW entry on Rubinstein-Taybi Syndrome
 GeneCard
 
 
 

Transcription coregulators